The 2014 United States House of Representatives elections in Pennsylvania were held on Tuesday, November 4, 2014, to elect the 18 U.S. representatives from the Commonwealth of Pennsylvania, one from each of the state's 18 congressional districts. The elections coincided with other elections to the United States Senate and House of Representatives and various state and local elections, including the Governor of Pennsylvania and Lieutenant Governor of Pennsylvania.

Overview
Results of the 2014 United States House of Representatives elections in Pennsylvania by district:

District 1

The 1st district includes central and South Philadelphia, the City of Chester, the Philadelphia International Airport and other small sections of Delaware County. The incumbent is Democrat Bob Brady, who has represented the district since 1998. He was re-elected with 85% of the vote in 2012 and the district has a PVI of D+28.

Democratic primary

Candidates

Nominee
Bob Brady, incumbent U.S. Representative

Primary results

Republican primary

Candidates

Nominee
Megan Rath, medical-equipment saleswoman

Primary results

General election

Endorsements

Results

District 2

The 2nd district includes parts of West Philadelphia, North Philadelphia and Northwest Philadelphia in addition to Lower Merion Township in Montgomery County. The incumbent is Democrat Chaka Fattah, who has represented the district since 1995. He was re-elected with 89% of the vote in 2012 and the district has a PVI of D+38.

Democratic primary

Candidates

Nominee
Chaka Fattah, incumbent U.S. Representative

Primary results

Republican primary

Candidates

Nominee
Armond James, schoolteacher

Primary results

General election

Endorsements

Results

District 3

The 3rd district is located in Northwestern Pennsylvania and includes the cities of Erie, Sharon, Hermitage, Butler and Meadville. The incumbent is Republican Mike Kelly, who has represented the district since 2011. He was re-elected with 55% of the vote in 2012 and the district has a PVI of R+8.

Republican primary

Candidates

Nominee
Mike Kelly, incumbent U.S. Representative

Primary results

Democratic primary

Candidates

Nominee
Dan LaVallee, former deputy director in the America's Health Insurance Plans's product policy department

Withdrawn
Rob Joswiak, Air Force veteran
Matt Ryan, veteran

Primary results

General election

Endorsements

Results

District 4

The 4th district is located in South Central Pennsylvania and includes all of Adams and York counties and parts of Cumberland County. The incumbent is Republican Scott Perry, who has represented the district since 2013. He was elected with 60% of the vote in 2012 and the district has a PVI of R+9.

Republican primary

Candidates

Nominee
Scott Perry, incumbent U.S. Representative

Primary results

Democratic primary

Candidates

Nominee
Linda D. Thompson, former Mayor of Harrisburg

Primary results

General election

Endorsements

Results

District 5

The 5th district, the state's largest and most sparsely populated, is located in North Central Pennsylvania and includes all of Cameron, Centre, Clarion, Clinton, Elk, Forest, Huntingdon, Jefferson, McKean and Potter counties and parts of Clearfield, Crawford, Erie, Tioga, Warren and Venango counties. The incumbent is Republican Glenn Thompson, who has represented the district since 2009. He was re-elected with 63% of the vote in 2012 and the district has a PVI of R+8.

Republican primary

Candidates

Nominee
Glenn Thompson, incumbent U.S. Representative

Results

Democratic primary

Candidates

Nominee
Kerith Strano Taylor, family law attorney

Eliminated in primary
Thomas Tarantella, U.S. Army veteran

Declined
Jay Paterno, former assistant football coach at Penn State and the son of former head coach Joe Paterno (running for Lieutenant Governor)

Endorsements

Results

General election

Endorsements

Results

District 6

The 6th district includes communities north and west of the City of Philadelphia. The incumbent is Republican Jim Gerlach, who has represented the district since 2003. He was re-elected with 57% of the vote in 2012 and the district has a PVI of R+2. Gerlach is retiring.

Republican primary

Candidates

Nominee
 Ryan Costello, chairman of the Chester County Board of Commissioners

Declined
 Patrick Collins, biotech executive
 Val DiGiorgio, chairman of the Chester County Republican Party
 Jim Gerlach, incumbent U.S. Representative
 Harry Lewis, former chair of the Brandywine Health Foundation
 John Rafferty, Jr., state senator (running for re-election)
 Sam Rohrer, former state representative, candidate for governor in 2010 and candidate for the U.S. Senate in 2012

Results

Democratic primary
Despite landing their top recruit in businessman and West Point graduate Mike Parrish, national Democrats were left disappointed when he quit the race on 18 March stating “I have come to realize that an expensive and contentious Democratic primary fight would seriously risk our party’s ability to win this seat in November to accomplish our goals". He had previously received criticism for only switching party affiliation to Democrat in late 2013 having been a registered Republican all his adult life.

Candidates

Nominee
 Manan Trivedi, physician and nominee for the district in 2010 and 2012

Withdrawn
 Mike Parrish, businessman and retired US Army colonel

Declined
 Chris Casey, attorney and brother of Senator Bob Casey, Jr.
 Kathi Cozzone, member of the Chester County Board of Commissioners
 Andy Dinniman, state senator
 Phil LaRue, spokesman for the New Democrat Coalition
 Daylin Leach, state senator (ran in the 13th district)
 Josh Maxwell, Mayor of Downingtown
 Katie McGinty, former Secretary of the Pennsylvania Department of Environmental Protection and former Chair of the Council on Environmental Quality (ran for governor)
 Leslie Richards, Montgomery County commissioner
 Mark Rozzi, state representative
 Judy Schwank, state senator
 Josh Young, Caln Township commissioner

Endorsements

Results

General election

Endorsements

Polling

Predictions

General election

Results

District 7

The 7th district is located in the Philadelphia suburbs, including most of Delaware County along with portions of Chester, Montgomery, Berks and Lancaster counties. The incumbent is Republican Pat Meehan, who has represented the district since 2011. He was re-elected with 59% of the vote in 2012 and the district has a PVI of R+2.

Republican primary

Candidates

Nominee
Pat Meehan, incumbent U.S. Representative

Primary results

Democratic primary

Candidates

Nominee
Mary Ellen Balchunis, political science professor at La Salle University

Primary results

General election

Endorsements

Results

District 8

The 8th district is located in Southeastern Pennsylvania and includes Bucks County, along with portions of Montgomery County. The incumbent is Republican Mike Fitzpatrick, who has represented the district since 2011, and previously represented it from 2005 to 2007. He was re-elected with 57% of the vote in 2012 and the district has a PVI of R+1.

Republican primary

Candidates

Nominee
Mike Fitzpatrick, incumbent U.S. Representative

Results

Democratic primary

Candidates

Nominee
Kevin Strouse, United States Army Ranger

Eliminated in primary
Shaughnessy Naughton, research scientist and business owner

Declined
Kathy Boockvar, attorney, nominee for Commonwealth Court of Pennsylvania in 2011 and nominee for this seat in 2012

Endorsements

Results

General election

Endorsements

Polling

Results

District 9

The 9th district is located in South Central Pennsylvania and includes Cambria, Blair, Huntingdon, Franklin, Fulton, Bedford, Somerset, Fayette, Greene and Washington counties. The incumbent is Republican Bill Shuster, who has represented the district since 2001. He was re-elected with 62% of the vote in 2012 and the district has a PVI of R+10.

Republican primary
Shuster, the chairman of the House Committee on Transportation and Infrastructure, anticipated a primary challenge from Republicans unhappy with his support for earmarks that bring costly projects to the district.

Candidates

Nominee
 Bill Shuster, incumbent U.S. Representative

Eliminated in primary
 Art Halvorson, businessman and Coast Guard veteran
 Travis Schooley, businessman and disqualified candidate for this seat in 2012

Endorsements

Polling

Results

Democratic primary

Candidates

Nominee
Alanna Hartzok, Mental health professional, author, environmental activist and co-founder of the Earth Rights Institute

Results

General election

Endorsements

Results

District 10

The 10th district is located in Northeastern Pennsylvania and includes Monroe, Pike, Lackawanna, Wayne, Susquehanna, Bradford, Tioga, Sullivan, Lycoming, Union, Columbia, Snyder, Mifflin, Juniata and Perry counties. The incumbent is Republican Tom Marino, who has represented the district since 2011. He was re-elected with 66% of the vote in 2012 and the district has a PVI of R+12.

Nick Troiano, a James Madison Fellow with the non-profit Millennial Action Project is running as an Independent.

Republican primary

Candidates

Nominee
Tom Marino, incumbent U.S. Representative

Declined
Doug McLinko, Bradford County Commissioner

Primary results

Democratic primary

Candidates

Nominee
Scott Brion, businessman and energy industry executive

Withdrawn
Adam Rodriguez, former carpenter

Primary results

General election

Endorsements

Polling

Results

District 11

The 11th district is located in Northeastern Pennsylvania and includes Wyoming, Luzerne, Columbia, Carbon, Northumberland, Dauphin, Perry and Cumberland counties. The incumbent is Republican Lou Barletta, who has represented the district since 2011. He was re-elected with 59% of the vote in 2012 and the district has a PVI of R+6.

Republican primary

Candidates

Nominee
Lou Barletta, incumbent U.S. Representative

Primary results

Democratic primary

Candidates

Nominee
Andrew Ostrowski, civil rights attorney and former Susquehanna Township attorney

Declined
Chris Carney, former U.S. Representative
Gene Stilp, political activist and nominee for this seat in 2012 (running for State Representative)

Primary results

General election

Endorsements

Results

District 12

The 12th district is located in Southwestern Pennsylvania and includes all of Beaver County and parts of Allegheny, Cambria, Lawrence, Somerset and Westmoreland counties. The incumbent is Republican Keith Rothfus, who has represented the district since 2013. He was elected with 52% of the vote in 2012, defeating Democratic incumbent Mark Critz. The district has a PVI of R+9.

Republican primary

Candidates

Nominee
Keith Rothfus, incumbent U.S. Representative

Primary results

Democratic primary

Candidates

Nominee
Erin McClelland, psychologist and businesswoman

Eliminated in primary
John Hugya, former Chief of Staff to U.S. Representative John Murtha

Declined
Mark Critz, former U.S. Representative (running for lieutenant governor)

Primary results

General election

Endorsements

Results

District 13

The 13th district is located in Southeastern Pennsylvania, covering eastern Montgomery County and Northeast Philadelphia. The incumbent is Democrat Allyson Schwartz, who has represented the district since 2005. She was re-elected with 69% of the vote in 2012 and the district has a PVI of D+13.

Schwartz did not run for re-election. She is instead ran for Governor of Pennsylvania.

Democratic primary

Candidates

Nominee
 Brendan F. Boyle, state representative

Eliminated in primary
 Val Arkoosh, physician and Democratic activist
 Daylin Leach, state senator
 Marjorie Margolies, former U.S. Representative

Withdrawn
 Mark B. Cohen, state representative
 Jonathan Saidel, former Philadelphia City Controller

Declined
 Bill Green, Philadelphia City Councilman
 Mark Levy, Montgomery County Prothonotary (endorsed Brendan Boyle)
 Ed Neilson, state representative
 Leslie Richards, Montgomery County commissioner (endorsed Marjorie Margolies)
 John Sabatina, state representative
 Josh Shapiro, chairman of the Montgomery County Board of Commissioners
 Jared Solomon, attorney
 Michael J. Stack III, state senator (ran for lieutenant governor)
 LeAnna Washington state senator (endorsed Marjorie Margolies)

Endorsements

Polling

Results

Republican primary

Candidates

Nominee
 Carson "Dee" Adcock, businessman and nominee for this seat in 2010

Eliminated in primary
 Beverly Plosa-Bowser, retired U.S. Air Force Colonel

Withdrawn
 John Fritz, businessman and Northeast Philadelphia Republican Party Committeeman
 Clay McQueen, security consultant and systems specialist
 Everett Stern, businessman and whistleblower

Declined
 Marina Kats, attorney and nominee for this seat in 2008
 Joshua Quinter, attorney

Results

General election

Endorsements

Results

District 14

The 14th district includes the entire city of Pittsburgh and parts of surrounding suburbs. The incumbent is Democrat Michael F. Doyle, who has represented the district since 2003, and previously represented the 18th district from 1995 to 2003. He was re-elected with 77% of the vote in 2012 and the district has a PVI of D+15.

Democratic primary

Candidates

Nominee
Michael F. Doyle, incumbent U.S. Representative

Eliminated in primary
Janis C. Brooks, pastor, CEO/founder of Citizens to Abolish Domestic Apartheid and candidate for this seat in 2012

Results

Republican primary
Ken Peoples, the chairman of the White Oak Republican Committee, had declared his candidacy for the Republican nomination, but was removed from the ballot for collecting insufficient ballot petition signatures. He subsequently ran a write-in campaign for the Republican nomination in the State House's 35th Legislative District. Bob Howard, a former candidate for Allegheny County Controller in 2011, ran a write-in campaign for the Republican nomination. Howard would need 1,000 certified write-in votes to be nominated. At least 1,498 Republican write-in votes were recorded in the district, but certifying them would take several weeks.

General election

Endorsements

Results

District 15

The 15th district is located in Eastern Pennsylvania and includes Lehigh County and parts of Berks, Dauphin, Lebanon and Northampton counties. The incumbent is Republican Charlie Dent, who has represented the district since 2005. He was re-elected with 57% of the vote in 2012 and the district has a PVI of R+2.

Dent was unopposed in the Republican primary and did not face a Democratic opponent in the general election as none filed before the deadline.

Republican primary

Candidates

Nominee
Charlie Dent, incumbent U.S. Representative

Primary results

Democratic primary

Candidates

Declined
David A. Clarke
Rick Daugherty, chairman of the Lehigh County Democratic Party and nominee for this seat in 2012

General election

Endorsements

Results

District 16

The 16th district is located in Southeastern Pennsylvania, just west of Philadelphia and includes a large portion of southern Chester County, most of Lancaster County and a sliver of Berks County, including the city of Reading. The incumbent is Republican Joe Pitts, who has represented the district since 1997. He was re-elected with 55% of the vote in 2012 and the district has a PVI of R+4.

Republican primary

Candidates

Nominee
Joe Pitts, incumbent U.S. Representative

Primary results

Democratic primary

Candidates

Nominee
Tom Houghton, former State Representative

Eliminated in primary
Raja Kittappa, stem cell researcher

Primary results

General election

Endorsements

Results

District 17

The 17th district is located in Eastern Pennsylvania and includes Schuylkill, Carbon, Monroe, Luzerne and Lackawanna counties. The incumbent is Democrat Matt Cartwright, who has represented the district since 2013. He was elected in 2012, defeating incumbent Democrat Tim Holden in the primary with 57% of the vote and winning the general election with 60% of the vote. The district has a PVI of D+4.

Democratic primary

Candidates

Nominee
Matt Cartwright, incumbent U.S. Representative

Results

Republican primary

Candidates

Nominee
David Moylan, Schuylkill County coroner

Eliminated in primary
Matt Connolly, sports car racing team owner
Matthew Dietz, charter pilot

Results

General election

Endorsements

Results

District 18

The 18th district is located in the southern suburbs of Pittsburgh and includes parts of Allegheny, Washington, Beaver and Westmoreland counties. The incumbent is Republican Timothy F. Murphy, who has represented the district since 2003. He was re-elected with 64% of the vote in 2012 and the district has a PVI of R+10.

Republican primary

Candidates

Nominee
Timothy F. Murphy, incumbent U.S. Representative

Primary results

Democratic primary
Murphy did not face a Democratic opponent in the general election as none filed before the deadline.

General election

Endorsements

Results

See also
 2014 United States House of Representatives elections
 2014 United States elections

References

External links
U.S. House elections in Pennsylvania, 2014 at Ballotpedia
Campaign contributions at OpenSecrets

Pennsylvania
2014
United States House of Representatives